

446001–446100 

|-bgcolor=#f2f2f2
| colspan=4 align=center | 
|}

446101–446200 

|-bgcolor=#f2f2f2
| colspan=4 align=center | 
|}

446201–446300 

|-bgcolor=#f2f2f2
| colspan=4 align=center | 
|}

446301–446400 

|-bgcolor=#f2f2f2
| colspan=4 align=center | 
|}

446401–446500 

|-id=500
| 446500 Katrinraynor ||  || Katrin Raynor-Evans (born 1981) is a British philatelist specializing in the history and collection of astronomy-themed stamps. She is an amateur astronomer and writer for popular astronomy magazines, and a Fellow of The Royal Astronomical Society. || 
|}

446501–446600 

|-bgcolor=#f2f2f2
| colspan=4 align=center | 
|}

446601–446700 

|-bgcolor=#f2f2f2
| colspan=4 align=center | 
|}

446701–446800 

|-bgcolor=#f2f2f2
| colspan=4 align=center | 
|}

446801–446900 

|-bgcolor=#f2f2f2
| colspan=4 align=center | 
|}

446901–447000 

|-bgcolor=#f2f2f2
| colspan=4 align=center | 
|}

References 

446001-447000